Shizuoka City Central Gymnasium is an arena in Shizuoka, Shizuoka, Japan. It is the home arena of the Veltex Shizuoka of the B.League, Japan's professional basketball league.

Facilities
 Main arena - 61.0m x 40.0m

References

Basketball venues in Japan
Sports venues in Shizuoka Prefecture
Indoor arenas in Japan
Buildings and structures in Shizuoka (city)
Veltex Shizuoka